Leonard Sargeant (March 17, 1793 – June 18, 1880) was a Vermont politician and lawyer who served as the 15th lieutenant governor of Vermont from 1846 to 1848.

Early life
Sargeant was born in Dorset, Vermont on March 17, 1793.  He studied law and became an attorney in Manchester, practicing with Richard Skinner.  Sargeant was also a farmer and served as Vice President of the Vermont Agricultural Society. He was active in the Whig party, and served in numerous offices including probate judge, state's attorney, postmaster and justice of the peace. He was a member of the Vermont Council of Censors in 1827, and a delegate to the 1836 Vermont constitutional convention.

His legal career included the noteworthy defense of Stephen and Jesse Boorn, brothers who were convicted and sentenced to life in prison (Jesse) and death (Stephen) for the killing of Russell Colvin, a man missing from Manchester.  Several years later Colvin returned to Vermont to prove that he was still alive.  He had moved to New Jersey after an altercation with the Boorns and changed his name.  The Boorn case is the first known instance of a wrongful conviction for murder in the United States.

Political career
Sargeant served in both the Vermont House of Representatives and Vermont Senate in the 1830s and 1840s. From 1846 to 1848 he served as Lieutenant Governor.

After leaving office he practiced law until retiring in the 1870s.

Retirement and death
In retirement Sargeant resided at his daughter's home in Johnstown, Pennsylvania.  He died in Johnstown on June 18, 1880 and was buried at Dellwood Cemetery in Manchester.

References 

1793 births
1880 deaths
Vermont lawyers
Vermont Whigs
19th-century American politicians
Members of the Vermont House of Representatives
Vermont state senators
Lieutenant Governors of Vermont
People from Manchester, Vermont
Vermont state court judges
19th-century American judges
19th-century American lawyers